Garber as a surname may refer to:

 Anne Garber, a Canadian journalist, restaurant critic, and food and travel writer
 Bette Garber (1942–2008), an American photojournalist
 Cassandra Garber, a Creole and president of the Krio Descendants Union
 Daniel Garber (1880–1958), an American Impressionist painter
 David S. Garber, a professional television writer
 Don Garber (1957–), an American sports executive and commissioner of Major League Soccer
 Eileen Garber (1949–), an American novelist now known as Eileen Buckholtz
 Frederick W. Garber (1877–1950), an American architect
 Gene Garber (1947–), an American baseball pitcher
 Gottlieb Garber, American politician
 Harvey C. Garber (1866–1938), a U.S. Representative from Ohio
 Helen K. Garber (1954–), an American photographer
 Hope Garber (1924–2005), a Canadian actress and singer
 J. Ryan Garber (1973–), an American composer
 Jacob A. Garber (1879–1953), a U.S. Representative from Virginia
 Jake Garber (born 1965), American make-up artist
 Jan Garber (1894–1977), an American jazz bandleader
 John Garber (1833–1908), Justice of the Supreme Court of Nevada
 Joseph R. Garber (1943–2005), an American author
 Marjorie Garber (1944–), a professor and author about sexuality
 Mary Garber (1916–2008), an American sportswriter
 Matthew Garber (1956–1977), an English actor
 Milton C. Garber (1867–1948), a U.S. Representative from Oklahoma
 Mitch Garber, a Canadian international business executive
 Paul Garber, an American primatologist
 Paul E. Garber (1899–1992), a head of the National Air Museum of the Smithsonian Institution, Washington, D.C
 Randy Garber (soccer) (1952–), an American soccer player
 Silas Garber (1883–1905), a former governor of Nebraska
 Terri Garber (1960–), an American actress
 Victor Garber (1949–), a Canadian actor and singer

See also 
 Garber (disambiguation)
 Garbers

Surnames